Shannon is an unincorporated community in Atchison County, Kansas, United States.

History
Shannon was platted in 1883.

A post office was opened in Shannon in 1882, and remained in operation until it was discontinued in 1941.

See also
Shannon Township, Atchison County, Kansas

References

Further reading

External links
 Atchison County maps: Current, Historic, KDOT

Unincorporated communities in Atchison County, Kansas
Unincorporated communities in Kansas
1883 establishments in Kansas
Populated places established in 1883